Eldorado (-) is a city in and the county seat of Schleicher County, Texas, United States. The population was 1,951 at the 2010 census.

Geography 
Eldorado is located at  (30.860746, −100.598329).

According to the United States Census Bureau, the city has a total area of 1.4 square miles (3.6 km), all of it land.

Demographics

2020 census 

As of the 2020 United States census, there were 1,574 people, 791 households, and 544 families residing in the city.

2000 census 
As of the census of 2000, 1,951 people, 712 households, and 513 families resided in the city. The population density was 1,407.5 people per square mile (541.9/km). There were 838 housing units at an average density of 604.6 per square mile (232.8/km). The racial makeup of the city was 70.63% White, 2.15% African American, 0.10% Native American, 0.26% Asian, 0.05% Pacific Islander, 24.24% from other races, and 2.56% from two or more races. Hispanics or Latinos of any race were 53.92% of the population.

Of the 712 households, 37.9% had children under the age of 18 living with them, 58.7% were married couples living together, 10.0% had a female householder with no husband present, and 27.9% were not families. About 26.3% of all households were made up of individuals, and 13.1% had someone living alone who was 65 years of age or older. The average household size was 2.67 and the average family size was 3.26.

In the city, the population was distributed as 30.4% under the age of 18, 7.7% from 18 to 24, 24.7% from 25 to 44, 21.3% from 45 to 64, and 16.0% who were 65 years of age or older. The median age was 36 years. For every 100 females, there were 96.9 males. For every 100 females age 18 and over, there were 89.4 males.

The median income for a household in the city was $27,682, and for a family was $30,781. Males had a median income of $26,172 versus $18,750 for females. The per capita income for the city was $12,994. About 20.8% of families and 26.1% of the population were below the poverty line, including 35.6% of those under age 18 and 26.2% of those age 65 or over.

Education 

The City of Eldorado is served by the Schleicher County Independent School District.

At the end of the 2007–2008 school year, the state of Texas ruled Eldorado High School as "Academically Unacceptable". In 2010, the school has been determined to be "Academically Acceptable".

Yearning for Zion Ranch 
Eldorado was the nearest city to the Yearning for Zion Ranch (YFZ Ranch), the headquarters of the Fundamentalist Church of Jesus Christ of Latter Day Saints headed by convicted sex offender felon Warren Jeffs.  Over 400 children were removed from the compound in April 2008 by Texas Child Protective Services.  Hundreds of children were taken into custody and temporarily placed into foster homes.  The children were returned to their mothers shortly afterward. In 2018, the YFZ Ranch was sold off and closed.

Media portrayals 
The movie El Dorado, starring John Wayne and Robert Mitchum, takes place in a fictional "El Dorado" during the late 1800s. The real town of Eldorado did not exist until 1895, well after the date John Wayne's fictional adventure. Eldorado was shown in the 2022 Netflix documentary “Keep Sweet: Pray and Obey” about the FLDS community.

Gallery

References

External links 

 The Eldorado Success Newspaper – Official website

Cities in Texas
Cities in Schleicher County, Texas
County seats in Texas
Fundamentalist Church of Jesus Christ of Latter-Day Saints
Latter Day Saint movement in Texas
Populated places established in 1895